M.Y.O.B. (a.k.a. Mind Your Own Business) is the seventh studio album by American singer-songwriter Debbie Gibson, released on March 6, 2001 on her own Golden Egg record label. It was released in Japan by Nippon Columbia under the Portazul label with the bonus track "Light the World" featuring Peabo Bryson.

The album was included in the 2017 box set We Could Be Together, with two additional songs and two remixes as bonus tracks.

Singles

"M.Y.O.B." was promoted as a single first.

Billboard's Dance single reviewer described follow-up single "What You Want" as "a cutting-edge moment, featuring the recognizable vocals of this old friend and soul-saturating production from never-failing maestro [remixer] Tony Moran" but acknowledged that DJs may have "lingering prejudices" against Gibson. The single received light airplay in Spring 2001 but did not chart.

"What You Want", released as the first single, was heavily promoted and has an accompanying music video; however, "What You Want" just missed charting on the Billboard Hot 100. "What You Want" did get some Rhythmic/dance format radio airplay, but airplay stalled and faded since the single came with no club mixes.  This single includes "Comes Right Back" (Campfire Mix), which was not included on M.Y.O.B. "Your Secret" was released as a single with remixes by Mike Rizzo; the song did not chart on any major chart. Gibson's company, Golden Egg Records, coordinated a set of remixes of "Jaded" from remixer Musica Technica but failed to provide the remixer the vocal audio before Gold Egg Records shut down for a period of time starting in 2002.

Track listing

Personnel
Deborah Gibson
Paul Pesco - guitar (tracks 2, 4-10)
Steve Lashley - bass (tracks 5, 6, 8)
Gary Corbett - keyboards, programming (tracks 2, 4-10)
Bashiri Johnson - percussion (tracks 2, 4-6, 8-10)
Brenda White King (tracks 4, 6, 7, 9, 10), Cindy Mizelle (tracks 2, 4-10), Fonzi Thornton (tracks 2, 4-10), Robin Clark (tracks 2, 5, 8) - backing vocals
with:
Ira Siegel (track 1), Larry Saltzman (track 11) - guitar
Zev Katz (tracks 7, 9), Conrad Korsch (track 10) - bass

References

External links
 
 
 

2001 albums
Debbie Gibson albums
Self-released albums
Soul albums by American artists